Lacazella is a genus of brachiopods belonging to the family Thecideidae.

The genus has almost cosmopolitan distribution.

Species:

Lacazella australis 
Lacazella caribbeanensis 
Lacazella mauritiana 
Lacazella mediterranea 
Lacazella nana 
Lacazella novazelandiae

References

Brachiopod genera